RNT may refer to:

 Radiodiffusion Nationale Tchadienne, state broadcaster of Chad

Renton Municipal Airport, Washington, US
ISP member of Interlan Romanian Internet Exchange